Reigning champion Hazel Hotchkiss won the singles tennis title of the 1911 U.S. Women's National Singles Championship by defeating Florence Sutton 8–10, 6–1, 9–7 in the challenge round. Sutton had won the right to challenge Hotchkiss by defeating Eleonora Sears 6–2, 6–1 in the final of the All Comers' competition. The event was played on outdoor grass courts and held at the Philadelphia Cricket Club in Wissahickon Heights, Chestnut Hill, Philadelphia, from June 12 through June 17, 1911.

Draw

Challenge round

All Comers' finals

References

1911
1911 in American women's sports
June 1911 sports events
Women's Singles
Chestnut Hill, Philadelphia
1910s in Philadelphia
1911 in sports in Pennsylvania
Women's sports in Pennsylvania